Thicourt is a commune in the Moselle department in Grand Est in north-eastern France. In 2019, the municipality had 135 inhabitants, decreasing by 6.9% compared to 2013.

See also
 Communes of the Moselle department

References

External links
 

Communes of Moselle (department)